Nru Nsukka is a suburb located in Nsukka town. Nru Nsukka is one of the former old three autonomous communities: Mkpunanor, Nru and Ihe n'Owerre that made up the Nsukka urban area. Nru Nsukka having been upgraded to a suburban area was split into three newer autonomous communities with newly installed traditional rulers.
Since 2018, the suburb is now made up of Iheagu Nru autonomous community with its traditional ruler as Sylvanus Arumah, Ezema ne Edem autonomous community with its traditional ruler as Linus.O. Atugwu and the youngest being Umuoyo Nru autonomous community with Paul Atanike as its traditional ruler elect.

Nru Nsukka is predominantly farmers and craftsmen, known for agriculture. The town has common boundaries with Ede-Oballa, Orba, Eha-Alumona town, Ikeagwu Village (where Voice FM Federal Radio Corporation of Nigeria 96.7Mhz is located) Isiakpu and Ihe n'Owerre Nsukka.

Hospitals in Nru
Good Shepherd hospital. This is a private hospital owned by Dr. Uzor. The hospital is situated behind Fen park hotels Ugwu-Nkwo.
Nsukka Medical Center, Ugwu-Nkwo, Nru Nsukka. This is owned by Dr. Oguonu.
General Hospital. This is located at the boundary between Nru Nsukka and Ede-Oballa.
Various other health facilities such as maternity homes are in place too.

Communities/villages
Nru Nsukka is made up of 4 communities which are traditionally referred to as being three in number. Thus the name-Nru n'ato.

The communities arranged in order of age/seniority are: Iheagu, Ezema n' Edem and Umuoyo. Ezema and Edem are referred as one community. Ezema and Edem are referred or pronounced as "Ezema ne Edem" meaning Ezema and Edem.
Each of these communities has a minimum of ten villages each.

Each of the communities are headed by its development unions, traditional rulers cum village heads (Onyishi) instituted by the various communities separately.

Villages are headed by the Onyishi who must be the oldest man in the village. The position is never campaigned for nor contested for. Once the present Onyishi is dead, any other male following him by age takes over.

Royal homes
Nru Nsukka has 3 traditional rulers installed not long ago Following the emergence and declaration of new autonomous communities carved out of the old Nru Community by the present Enugu state government Ifeanyi Ugwuanyi.

The pioneer traditional ruler of Nru is Igwe Sylvanus Arumah(Eze udo 1 of Nru) as the Igbo culture and Nsukka's own stand, he worked and is still working with his cabinet members now restricted only within Iheagu autonomous community as their own head.

Presently Nru n'ato Ezike Ekwuosu has three recognised traditional rulers and one namely; HRH Slyvanus Arumah and HRH Linus Okonkwo Atugwu, HRH Paul Atanike for Iheagu autonomous community, Ezema ne Edem autonomous community and Umuoyo autonomous community respectively.

The traditional rulers pick their cabinets predominantly from the various sub-communities making up their areas of jurisdiction either by elections or nominations within the villages involved.

Occupations
The major occupation in Nru is farming, and trading. The area is also dominated by artisans who engage in various forms of handiworks such as blacksmithing in Amora in Ezema Nru, building works. On the area of farming, the people of Edem Nru and some parts of Iheagu specialized in cattle rearing and sales. In addition, Nrunians  also have academics and professionals in diverse fields. The community has produced just one professor Prof. Asadu Anija Charles Livinus.

Education
Some of the schools in Nru Nsukka.
Community secondary school, Nru (former Boys secondary school, Nru Nsukka)
Central Primary School, Nru Nsukka/Ncheke
Hillview Primary School, Edem Nru Nsukka
Union primary school (Eke-agu)Iheagu Nru Nsukka
Evangel Primary School, Otobogidi Nru Nsukka.
Hillview Unique Secondary School, Edem Nru Nsukka.
All Saints secondary school, Nru Nsukka.
Holy Redeemer Catholic schools Nru Nsukka.
Amicus primary school, Nru Nsukka.
Royal Crown Academy Nsukka
Modern secondary school, Nsukka
City comprehensive school Nsukka.
Presently, Nru has just one government-owned secondary school.

Heads/organizations
Vital bodies in Nru are: Nru Town Union, Igwes and their cabinets, Akpuruarua Nru and Nru Youths, Umu Ada. Nru Town Union was formerly known and addressed as Nru Development Union. This body was established in Nru in the early 90s. Nru Town Union determines and directs most of the day-to-day affairs in Nru. 
Nru Town Union presently(2019) is headed by Chief Simon Agboeze. Simon Agboeze is from Umuoyo Nru.
The body is made up of representatives from over 50villages that made up Nru Nsukka and some other representatives from the title holders.

Igwe and his cabinet is the second main body in Nru. Igwe being the traditional ruler of Nru Nsukka has his cabinet selected from all the four sub-communities that formed Nru Nsukka. The royal chamber works in hand with the Nru Town Union and takes instruction from the body at rare cases.

The Akpuaruas is the third body in Nru. This body, mostly made up of the eldest, contributes much in decision making with regards to Nru Nsukka and Nsukka in general. The Akpuruarua is composed of all the Onyishi (village heads in Nsukka culture are called Onyishi meaning the head.  Onyishi must be the oldest man among his people) and the "'Oha'" (title holders).

"'Nru Youths Association"' is the fourth body in Nru. Though the body has representatives from all the villages in Nru.

Social network
Nru Nsukka has a Facebook page tagged "'Nru Nsukka"'.

References

 http://www.unn.edu.ng/internals/staff/viewProfile/MjEw
A ward councilor from Nru Nsukka shelters a homeless and childless aged woman.
 The name Nru Nsukka as published by 2012 edition of Enugu state government journal.
 http://www.sparc-nigeria.com › filesPDF, Web results, Enugu State Government Mandates and Structure - SPARC Nigeria

External links
 http://www.naijasky.com/nsukka/398/the-three-prominent-communities-in-nsukka/6311/
community secondary school Nru website
 http://www.heyplaces.com.ng
 http://dailytimes.ng/enugu-timber-dealers-hail-passage-laws/ Hon. Celestine Ogbu speaker Nsukka
https://web.archive.org/web/20160923073743/http://www.enugustate.gov.ng/about-enugustate/
 https://web.archive.org/web/20161014052905/https://thestarlite.wordpress.com/2009/09/01/royal-war-oha-nsukka-battles-igwe-okolo/  Slyvanus Arumah.
https://ww2.radionigeria.gov.ng/frnews-detail.php?ID=10361 Emmanuel Otti.
https://www.unn.edu.ng/internals/staff/viewProfile/MjEw Prof. Asadu Charles Anija
http://m.vconnect.com/nsukka-medical-centre-nsukka-enugu_b1306196 Shown names of hospitals in Nru Nsukka
http://www.ebeano.org/LocalGovernments.html
http://nsukkacatholicdiocese.org/nsukka-deanery.html Holy Redeemer Parish Nru Nsukka
https://thenationonlineng.net/nsukka-plans-to-build-chamber/
https://puoreports.ng/2018/11/12/gov-ugwuanyi-has-met-our-expectation-says-renowned-transport-magnet-dr-sam-maduka-onyishi/ Atugwu Linus Okonkwo crowned Igwe Ezema ne Edem
INDEPENDENT NATIONAL ELECTORAL COMMISSION, STATE: ENUGU

Populated places in Enugu State